Restless Willow is a studio album by jazz vocalist Stevie Holland.  The album is Holland's fourth and was released by 150 Music on October 26, 2004.

Track listing

Personnel
 Gary William Friedman and Stevie Holland, producers
 Gary William Friedman, arrangements and orchestrations
 George Small, piano
 Tim Ferguson, bass
 Sean Harkness, guitar
 Kenny Washington, drums
 Noel Sagerman, drums
 Steve Kroon, percussion
 David "Fathead" Newman, tenor sax
 Joe Mennonna, flute
 Rubén Flores, duet vocalist on "One Touch"

References

2004 albums
Stevie Holland albums